The quick condition of soil is the condition when the upward water pressure gradient and water flow reduce the effective stress, i.e., cohesiveness of the soil. Sandy soils  may lose their shear strength, and the soil may behave as a fluid‌. Cohesive soils may produce cracks with water seepage.

See also
Quicksand

References

Soil science